Horace Clyde Tuitt (born 25 January 1954) is a Trinidad and Tobago sprinter. He competed in the men's 4 × 400 metres relay at the 1976 Summer Olympics.

References

External links
 

1954 births
Living people
Athletes (track and field) at the 1976 Summer Olympics
Trinidad and Tobago male sprinters
Trinidad and Tobago male middle-distance runners
Olympic athletes of Trinidad and Tobago
Place of birth missing (living people)